Andrzej Załucki (born 2 September 1941 in Kolomyia, Ukrainian SSR) is a Polish diplomat and former Deputy Minister of Foreign Affairs (2002–2005). He served as Ambassador to the Russian Federation from 1996 to 2002 and to the Czech Republic from 2005 to 2006. He was deputy director in the political office of the Prime Minister 1995–1996.

In 2004, he received the Order of Prince Yaroslav the Wise, 5th class.

References

1941 births
Ambassadors of Poland to the Czech Republic
Ambassadors of Poland to Russia
Living people
Recipients of the Order of Prince Yaroslav the Wise, 5th class
People from Kolomyia
Polish United Workers' Party members